Basil Elliott Walton Morgan (born 13 May 1947) is a former West Indian cricketer and umpire. He stood in fifteen ODI games between 1996 and 2001.

See also
 List of One Day International cricket umpires

References

1947 births
Living people
West Indian One Day International cricket umpires